Euryaptus is a genus of beetles in the family Carabidae, containing the following species:

 Euryaptus assamensis Bates, 1892
 Euryaptus basirugatus Debault, Lassalle & Roux, 2008
 Euryaptus kankompezanum Morvan, 1992
 Euryaptus kirschenhoferi Straneo, 1983
 Euryaptus nigellus Bates, 1892
 Euryaptus rufipes Bates, 1892

References

Pterostichinae